Kudrawka  is a village in the administrative district of Gmina Nowy Dwór, within Sokółka County, Podlaskie Voivodeship, in north-eastern Poland, close to the border with Belarus.

References

Kudrawka